Dandakosaurus (meaning "Dandakaranya lizard") is a dubious genus of extinct averostran theropod dinosaur from the Kota Formation, Andhra Pradesh, India. It lived 183 to 175 million years ago from the latest Pliensbachian to the late Toarcian stages of the Early Jurassic. It is currently classified as Averostra incertae sedis, variously suggested to be a ceratosaur or basal tetanuran.

The holotype is partial pubis, GSI 1/54Y/76, discovered between 1958 and 1961 and described as a carnosaur in 1962. The type species, D. indicus, was named by Yadagiri in 1982. Little is known about the genus and some paleontologists consider it to be a nomen dubium. In 2016 it was estimated to be 10 meters (33 feet) in length and 2.3 tonnes (2.5 short tons) in weight.

See also 
 Timeline of ceratosaur research

References 

Ceratosaurs
Dinosaurs of India and Madagascar
Early Jurassic dinosaurs of Asia
Toarcian life
Fossils of India
Fossil taxa described in 1982
Nomina dubia